Sela na Krasu is a village in the Municipality of Miren-Kostanjevica in the Littoral region of Slovenia close to the border with Italy.

Name
The name of the settlement was changed from Sela to Sela na Krasu in 1952.

Church
The local church is dedicated to the Assumption of Mary and belongs to the Parish of Brestovica.

References

External links
Sela na Krasu on Geopedia

Populated places in the Municipality of Miren-Kostanjevica